The Christuskirche is the church and parish of German Protestants in Paris (25 rue Blanche, 9th arrondissement). Initially founded as a Lutheran church, today it is a United church. The present building was completed in 1894. The official name is Deutsche Evangelische Christuskirche – Église protestant allemande à Paris. The church is a member of the Evangelische Kirche in Deutschland (EKD). It has a tradition as a concert venue of church music, with Helga Schauerte as the organist from 1982.

History 
The German Protestant parish in Paris dates back to the 17th century, when Protestants were not permitted to hold services in Paris. Freedom of religion was granted by Napoleon in 1806. In the 19th century, around 70,000 Germans lived in Paris. They were guests in other churches for their services, until the present church was built in 1894. The building was confiscated during World War I. When it was returned to the German congregation in the 1920s, its interior was remodelled.

The instrument took part in the Universal Exhibition in Antwerp in 1894, and was awarded a Medal of Honor. It was dismantled in World War I, and transferred to the Church of Ascension, Rue Dulong, in Paris in 1919. The project of a new organ was supported by Albert Schweitzer, but was interrupted by World War II. The present organ was built in 1964 by Detlef Kleuker from Bielefeld. It is modeled after German Baroque organs. Konrad Adenauer, the German Chancellor, supported its financing.

The church is a venue of church music concerts. In 2014, the J. S. Bach-Stiftung held a sold-out concert of three cantatas from Bach's Christmas Oratorio which is rarely performed in Paris. The concert was repeated the following year. In 2016, three cantatas from the oratorio were performed by the Neue Bachgesellschaft, with German soloists and the chamber choir Les Temperamens Variations, conducted by Thibault Lam Quang. The group performed the complete oratorio there on 8 December 2019, with Jan Kobow as the Evangelist.

References

External links 

 

Buildings and structures in the 9th arrondissement of Paris
Protestant churches in Paris